Zgornja Draga is a settlement just west of Ivančna Gorica in the historical region of Lower Carniola in central Slovenia. The Municipality of Ivančna Gorica is included in the Central Slovenia Statistical Region.

Name
The name Zgornja Draga literally means 'upper Draga', distinguishing the settlement from neighboring Spodnja Draga (literally, 'lower Draga'). The name is derived from the Slovene common noun draga 'small, narrow valley', referring to the geographical location of the settlement.

Church

The local church is dedicated to Saint Martin and belongs to the Parish of Višnja Gora. It dates to the 12th century and has an 18th-century belfry.

References

External links
Zgornja Draga on Geopedia

Populated places in the Municipality of Ivančna Gorica